William Ernest Pavitt (30 June 1920 – 1989) was a professional footballer who played as a defender for Fulham 1949-1952 and made 79 appearances for Southend United1953-1954. He then moved into Non-League football signing for Tunbridge Wells United in 1955-1956 staying for three seasons before moving on to Ely City.

References

1920 births
1989 deaths
English footballers
English Football League players
Association football defenders
Fulham F.C. players
Southend United F.C. players
Tunbridge Wells F.C. players